William O. Shuman (July 23, 1921 – August 30, 1978) is a former Democratic member of the Pennsylvania House of Representatives. He graduated from Greencastle-Antrim High School.

References

1978 deaths
Democratic Party members of the Pennsylvania House of Representatives
1921 births
20th-century American politicians